Wong Kar-wai (born 17 July 1958) is a Hong Kong film director, screenwriter and producer. He began his career as a screenwriter in 1982, then made his directoral debut in 1988. As of 2019, he has directed 10 feature films. He has also worked as producer on several films he did not direct. Wong has also directed short films, commercials, and two music videos.

Filmography

Feature films

Regarding Wong's early work as a screenwriter, film scholar Peter Brunette noted that "different transcription systems from Chinese make compiling a filmography for a Chinese director an exercise in creativity and hope." Wong also claims to have contributed to c. 50 film scripts without official credit so a full filmography is difficult to provide.

Short films

Television

Commercials

Music videos

Collaborators

Wong frequently re-casts actors whom he has worked with on previous movies, except My Blueberry Nights.

See also
List of awards and nominations received by Wong Kar-wai

References

Sources

External links
Wong Kar-wai filmography at the Internet Movie Database

Wong, Kar-wai
Wong, Kar-wai
Wong, Kar-wai